Glasgow Art Club is a club for artists and lay members with an interest in the arts, that has become over the generations "a meeting place for artists, business leaders and academics". Each year it has a range of exhibitions open to the public for their enjoyment; and, subject to club events, a number of its rooms are available as venues for social occasions.

History and premises 

One of Glasgow's, and Scotland's, most creative institutions
Glasgow Art Club was founded in 1867. Membership is open to ladies, gentlemen, students and corporate organisations. The club premises include function rooms, studios, library, dining room and Gallery. Extensive exhibitions and events are programmed each year. It is based in Bath Street close to Blythswood Square, the area having been developed in the early 19th century by William Harley.

Following initial discussions by artists William Dennistoun, {Sir} David Murray and friends at a tea room above a baker's shop in Candleriggs, Glasgow, on the proposal to form a club, the first formal meetings of the club were held at the Waverley Temperance Hotel, on Buchanan Street, Glasgow, with Dennistoun elected the club's first president. Membership was to grow during the 1870s, with more artists joining and exhibitions being held and in 1875 the club moved to another hotel called the Waverley, this time one on the city's Sauchiehall Street. From there the club was to relocate to the Royal Hotel on the city's George Square, renting rooms for six months at a time, where life and sketching classes were held.

Membership of the club began to be extended beyond painters (in 1881 the pioneering photographer James Craig Annan was admitted as a ‘'photographic artist'’ and in 1903 John M. Crawford (another former pupil of Hamilton Academy), Fellow of the Royal Institute of British Architects, became the first architect to be elected President of Glasgow Art Club.) In 1878 the club moved to rented premises at 62 Bothwell Street and the need to raise funds led to a change in the club’s constitution and the admission in 1886 of male lay members with an interest in the arts (admission of women not extended until 1982.Glasgow Herald article 27 March 1982 Club opens its doors to women after 100 years Retrieved 2011-08-17 ) With membership burgeoning new premises were rented at 151 Bath Street, on Blythswood Hill originally developed by William Harley. These formally opened on 12 November 1886 but soon afterwards two adjacent town houses at 185 Bath Street were purchased, these converted by the architect John Keppie, a member of the club, creating also an exhibition gallery in what were the back gardens of the  houses. It has recently been confirmed that the young Charles Rennie Mackintosh was involved in the decorative details of the renovations and created a mural. The club’s new premises were formally opened on 14 June 1893.Glasgow Art Club history Retrieved 2011-08-17 The club  embarked in 2011 on a major programme of renovation of its historic category A Listed building on Bath Street, Glasgow., including the restoration of the Gallery frieze designed by Charles Rennie Mackintosh, who assisted John Keppie and John Honeyman in the design of the Gallery saloon.

The club first admitted women as members in 1984, and elected its first female president, Efric McNeil, in 2015.

In 2021 the Friends of Glasgow Museums moved their base to the Club, to continue its charitable activities in supporting art galleries and museums in Glasgow.

In 2022 Westbourne Music moved their base for lunchtime mid-week concerts to the Club.

Exhibitions and notable exhibitors

The club’s stature in Glasgow was confirmed when on the occasion of the official opening by the Prince of Wales of the Glasgow International Exhibition of Science, Art and Industry in 1888, the Lord Provost of Glasgow presented the Prince and Princess of Wales with an album of paintings by members of the Glasgow Art Club. In the succeeding years the club has played host to many events, including, on the evening of 28 October 1932 a dinner honouring Dr. Pittendrigh Macgillivray RSA, King’s Sculptor in Ordinary for Scotland a member of the Club for some fifty years, and club member James B. Anderson ARSA.

Initially the Club’s exhibitions were open only to members, in later years admission extended also to the general public. In 2008 Glasgow Art Club exhibited the jewelled panel The White Rose and The Red Rose by Margaret Macdonald Mackintosh, wife of Charles Rennie Mackintosh, before its sale for £1.7 million at Christie's on 30 April 2008. Since 2010 the club has opened its exhibition spaces and collections to the public on a regular basis (i.e. not just when specific exhibitions are being held.)

Many notable member artists have exhibited at the club's exhibitions, including:

The club's Winter exhibition of 1909 included works by: Sir James Guthrie, E A Hornel, Muirhead Bone (Britain's first official War Artist, knighted 1937) Sir David Murray RA

The club's Spring exhibition of 1923 included works by: E A Hornel, Sir David Murray RA, James Kay

The club's Memorial Exhibition of 1935 included works by: E A Walton, Sir James Guthrie, W Y Macgregor, James Paterson, Maurice William Greiffenhagen, Leslie Hunter, Stuart Park, E A Hornel

The club's exhibition April 1939 included works by: Sir John Lavery (exhibiting his The Lake at Ranelagh,) and J W Ferguson, who submitted a portrait

Club exhibitions and some touring exhibitions are staged each year.

Notable members
Notable members include:

 James B. Anderson ARSA 
 James Craig Annan
  Muriel Barclay
 George Telfer Bear 
 Sir Muirhead Bone
 Alexander Kellock Brown 
 Emilio Coia
  William Crosbie
  John Cunningham 
 Peter Wylie Davidson 
  George Devlin
 David Donaldson RSA RGI RP LLD DLit Painter and Limner to Her Majesty The Queen in Scotland
 Robert Eadie
  Norman Edgar 
 J W Ferguson
 Alexander Goudie
  Robert Greenlees 
 Maurice William Greiffenhagen 
 Sir James Guthrie 
  Ernest B Hood
  Norman Kirkham
 Sir David Murray RA
  Dr Tom Honeyman
 E A Hornel
 Leslie Hunter
 James Kay
 Robert Kelsey 
 Sir John Lavery
 Lord Macfarlane of Bearsden 
 John McGhie On-line biography, John McGhie 1868 – 1952 Retrieved 2011-08-17 
 Archibald A McGlashanOn-line biography Retrieved 2011-08-17
 Neil MacPhail 
 Allan D Mainds ARSA 
 Sir David Murray RA 
 Stuart Park 
  A N Paterson
 James Paterson
  Sir Francis Powell
 Alexander Proudfoot 
 Benno Schotz, Sculptor in Ordinary for Scotland
  Connie Simmers 
 George Singleton
 William Somerville Shanks 
 Archibald Macfarlane Shannan 
 A P Thomson 
 Murray Macpherson Tod 
 E A Walton

 References 

Additional sourcesGlasgow Art Club 1867 -1967, the First Hundred Years Glasgow Art Club 1967The Year’s Art 1890: A Concise Epitome of all Matters Relating to the Arts of Painting, Sculpture and Architecture which have occurred during the year 1889, together with information respecting the events of the year 1890'' page 158

Arts organizations established in 1867
Category A listed buildings in Glasgow
1867 establishments in Scotland